Licorne is French for unicorn. 

It may also refer to:

Military
 Licorne, a Russian muzzle-loading field gun
 Opération Licorne, a 21st-century French peacekeeping operation in Côte d'Ivoire
 Opération Licorne, a 1970 French nuclear test in French Polynesia, using the Licorne nuclear test device bomb; see Fangataufa#History
 , several ships of the French Navy

Places
 Rivière de la Licorne, Saguenay-Lac-Saint-Jean, Quebec, Canada
 Stade de la Licorne, a soccer stadium in Amiens, France
 La Licorne, Le Plateau-Mont-Royal, Montreal, Quebec, Canada; a theatre

Other uses
 "Licorne" (sculpture), a hood ornament designed by François Bazin (sculptor)
 La Licorne, a 1940s French literary magazine
 Les Licornes, a soccer club in Amiens, France
 Corre La Licorne, later becoming Licorne, a French automaker
 Unicorn (Tintin), a fictional ship from the French-language Belgian comic book Tintin

See also

 
 Unicorn (disambiguation)